Gene targeting (also, replacement strategy based on homologous recombination) is a genetic technique that uses homologous recombination to modify an endogenous gene. The method can be used to delete a gene, remove exons, add a gene and modify individual base pairs (introduce point mutations). The process of gene targeting provides a way to alter specific genes in order to better identify their biological roles. Gene targeting can be permanent or conditional. Conditions can be a specific time during development / life of the organism or limitation to a specific tissue, for example. Gene targeting requires the creation of a specific vector for each gene of interest. However, it can be used for any gene, regardless of transcriptional activity or gene size.

Methods 
In general, DNA containing part of the gene to be targeted, a reporter gene, and a (dominant) selectable marker is assembled in bacteria.

Gene targeting methods are established for several model organisms and may vary depending on the species used. To target genes in mice, the DNA is inserted into mouse embryonic stem cells in culture. Cells with the insertion can contribute to a mouse's tissue via embryo injection. Finally, chimeric mice where the modified cells make up the reproductive organs are bred. After this step the entire body of the mouse is based on the selected embryonic stem cell.

To target genes in moss, the DNA is incubated together with freshly isolated protoplasts and with polyethylene glycol. As mosses are haploid organisms, moss filaments (protonema) can be directly screened for the target, either by treatment with antibiotics or with PCR. Unique among plants, this procedure for reverse genetics is as efficient as in yeast. Gene targeting has been successfully applied to cattle, sheep, swine and many fungi.

The frequency of gene targeting can be significantly enhanced through the use of engineered endonucleases such as zinc finger nucleases, engineered homing endonucleases, and nucleases based on engineered TAL effectors.  This method has been applied to species including Drosophila melanogaster, tobacco, corn, human cells, mice and rats.

Comparison with gene trapping 
Gene trapping is based on random insertion of a cassette, while gene targeting manipulates a specific gene. Cassettes can be used for many different things while the flanking homology regions of gene targeting cassettes need to be adapted for each gene. This makes gene trapping more easily amenable for large scale projects than targeting. On the other hand, gene targeting can be used for genes with low transcriptions that would go undetected in a trap screen.  The probability of trapping increases with intron size, while for gene targeting, small genes are just as easily altered.

Applications
Gene targeting has been widely used to study human genetic diseases by removing ("knocking out"), or adding ("knocking in"), specific mutations of interest. Previously used to engineer rat cell models, advances in gene targeting technologies enable a new wave of isogenic human disease models. These models are the most accurate in vitro models available to researchers and facilitate the development of personalized drugs and diagnostics, particularly in oncology.

2007 Nobel Prize
Mario R. Capecchi, Martin J. Evans and Oliver Smithies were awarded the 2007 Nobel Prize in Physiology or Medicine for their work on "principles for introducing specific gene modifications in mice by the use of embryonic stem cells", or gene targeting.

See also 
 Cre recombinase
 Cre-Lox recombination
 FLP-FRT recombination
 Gene trapping (random gene knockout technique)
 Genetic recombination
 Homologous recombination
 Recombinase-mediated cassette exchange (exchange of a preexisting "gene cassette" for an "gene of interest")
 Site-specific recombinase technology
 Toll-like receptor (example of a gene targeted for analysis)
 Mus musculus (house mouse; common model organism)
 Physcomitrella patens (only plant in which gene targeting is available, as of 1998)

References

External links 

 Outline of gene targeting by the University of Michigan
 Gene targeting in mouse diagram & summary by Heydari lab, Wayne State University
 Research highlights on reporter genes  used in gene targeting
 Targeted gene replacement in barley

Molecular biology
Genetic engineering
Genetics techniques
Biological engineering
Genetically modified organisms